Piquiatuba Transportes Aéreos is a domestic airline based in Santarém, Pará, Brazil. Founded in 2005 it operates regular charter flights.

The company owns Piquiatuba Airfield (SNCJ) where most of its aircraft are kept and maintained.

History
Piquiatuba was founded in 2005.

Destinations
As of July 2016 Piquiatuba operated regular services to the following destinations:

Fleet
As of July 2015 the fleet of Piquiatuba Transportes Aéreas included the following aircraft:

Airline affinity program
Piquiatuba Linhas Aéreas has no Frequent Flyer Program.

Accidents and incidents 

 6 August 2010: An Embraer EMB-810C Seneca II registration PT-RMX en route from Piquiatuba airfield to Santarém for refueling experienced engine problems and landed on a farm. The pilot was unhurt. Investigation revealed the owner of the aircraft, Piquiatuba Taxi Áereo LTDA had not been following proper maintenance procedures.
 7 September 2017: A Cessna 210 registration PT-KKK on a medevac flight to Piquiatuba (SNCJ), 16 km southeast of the airport. The airplane lost engine power and diverted to Santarém. Unable to reach the runway, the pilot decided to land the aircraft on a beach 4 km east of the runway. All 4 people on board survived. The investigation concluded the airplane did not have enough fuel for the flights it made, ultimately resulting in the crash due to fuel starvation to the engine. This accident resulted in Brazil's Aeronautical Accidents Investigation and Prevention Center (CENIPA) recommending the suspension of Piquiatuba Taxi Aéreo's license due to poor operational safety management.

See also
List of airlines of Brazil

References

Airlines of Brazil
Airlines established in 2005